Oncallı (also, Ondzhally) is a village and municipality in the Qakh Rayon of Azerbaijan.  It has a population of 472.

References 

Populated places in Qakh District